My Family is a Malaysian Chinese drama co-produced by ntv7 and mm2 Entertainment. It was filmed in 2009 and aired on ntv7 starting 30 April 2012, at 6:00pm.

References

Chinese-language drama television series in Malaysia
2012 Malaysian television series debuts
2012 Malaysian television series endings
NTV7 original programming